Peter Allen: Not the Boy Next Door is a two-part Australian miniseries about music legend Peter Allen that screened on the Seven Network in 2015.

Plot synopsis
Peter Allen: Not the Boy Next Door tells the story of how Peter Allen rose from New South Wales to the Hollywood Hills and ends up becoming part of American royalty along the way.

Cast
 Joel Jackson as Peter Allen 
 Ky Baldwin as Young Peter Allen (Peter Woolnough)
 Sara West as Liza Minnelli
 Rebecca Gibney as Marion Woolnough (Allen's mother) 
 Sigrid Thornton as Judy Garland
 Henri Szeps as Dee Anthony
 Nick Farnell as Dick Woolnough
 Andrew Lees as Gregory Connell 
 Rob Mills as Chris Bell
 Elise McCann as Lynne Woolnough (Allen's sister)
 Christie Whelan Browne as Olivia Newton-John

Production
Filming of the miniseries took place in early 2015. It is written by Stephen MacLean, Michael Miller and Justin Monjo, and directed by Shawn Seet.

Awards

Ratings

Chart impact
Following the screening of episode one, Allen's 2006 album "The Ultimate Peter Allen" re-entered the ARIA Albums Chart at number 24, thus surpassing its 2006 peak of 50.
Likewise, the song "I Still Call Australia Home" re-entered the ARIA singles chart at number 60, surpassing its previous peak of 72 achieved in June 1982.

Following the screening of episode 2, "The Ultimate Peter Allen" rose to another new peak of 18, whilst the song "Tenterfield Saddler" made its ARIA singles chart debut at number 53.

References

External links
 

2010s Australian television miniseries
2015 Australian television series debuts
2015 Australian television series endings
Cultural depictions of Australian men
Cultural depictions of pop musicians
Seven Network original programming
Television series by Beyond Television Productions